The Spanish Royal Statute of 1834 established a bicameral legislature (Cortes) consisting of an upper chamber of unelected nobles and a lower chamber of elected representatives. The first session was opened on 24 July 1834 and closed on 29 May 1835.

Upper Chamber

Officers 
Presidents: Francisco Javier Castaños y Aragorri, Duque de Bailén (resigned); Pedro Agustín Girón, Duque de Ahumada y Marqués de las Amarillas.

Vice-presidents: José Gabriel Silva Bazán, Marqués de Santa Cruz (resigned); Mauricio Álvarez de las Asturias Bohorques y Chacón, Duque de Gor.

Secretaries: Diego Clemencín (died); Ángel Saavedra Ramírez de Baquedano, Duque de Rivas; Isidro Alfonso Sousa de Portugal y Guzmán, Marqués de Guadalcázar; Antonio Cano Manuel y Ramírez de Arellano (absent); Pedro Colón de Toledo y Ramírez de Baquedano, Duque de Veragua; Joaquín Fernández de Córdoba y Vera, Conde de Sástago (interim).

Members 
The following were appointed to the upper chamber:
 Luis del Águila Alvarado, Marqués de Espeja
  Fernando Aguilera y Contreras, Marqués de Cerralbo
  Miguel Ricardo de Álava y Esquivel
  Mauricio Álvarez de las Asturias Bohorques y Chacón, Duque de Gor
  Juan Álvarez Guerra Peña
  José Antonio Aragón Azlor y Pignatelli, Duque de Villahermosa
  Fernando Aranda y Salazar, Conde de Humanes
  Manuel María Aranguren Gaytán de Ayala, Conde de Monterrón
  Juan José Mateo Arias Dávila y Matheu, Conde de Puñonrostro
  Juan Armada Guerra, Marqués de Santa Cruz de Ribadulla
  Andrés Avelino Arteaga y Palafox, Marqués de Valmediano
  Luis Balanzat de Orbay y Briones
  Eusebio Bardají y Azara
  Antonio Bernaldo de Quirós y Rodríguez de los Ríos, Marqués de Monreal y de Santiago
  Juan Bautista Berthier Vaillant y de las Cuevas, Marqués de la Candelaria de Yarayabo
  Manuel de la Bodega Mollinedo
  Juan José Bonel y Orbe, Arzobispo de Toledo
  Francisco Javier de Burgos Olmo
  José de Cafranga
  Antonio Cano Manuel y Ramírez de Arellano
  José Fernando de Carvajal Vargas y de Queralt, Duque de San Carlos
  Francisco Javier Castaños y Aragorri, Duque de Bailén
  José Máximo Cernecio y Palafox, Conde de Parsent
  Mariano Chávez Villarroel, Duque de Noblejas
  Diego Clemencín
  Pedro Colón de Toledo y Ramírez de Baquedano
  Ambrosio de la Cuadra, Duque de Veragua
  Ramón de Despuig Zaforteza, Conde de Montenegro
  Francisco Javier Elio y Jiménez Navarro, Marqués de Vessolla
  José María de Ezpeleta Enrile, Conde de Ezpeleta
  Luis Joaquín Fernández de Córdoba y Benavides, Duque de Medinaceli
  Joaquín Fernández de Córdoba y Pacheco, Marqués de Malpica
  Joaquín Fernández de Córdoba y Vera, Conde de Sástago
  José Rafael Fernández de Híjar Silva y Rebolledo de Palafox, Duque de Híjar
  Bernardino Fernández de Velasco Benavides, Duque de Frías
  Lorenzo Fernández de Villavicencio Cañas y Portocarrero, Duque de San Lorenzo de Vallehermoso
  Francisco Fernández Del Pino, Conde de Pinofiel
  Martín Fernández Navarrete y Jiménez de Tejada
  Pedro José Fonte, Arzobispo de México
  Manuel Fraile, Patriarca de las Indias
  Manuel Freire de Andrade, Marqués de San Marcial
  José García de León y Pizarro
  Manuel García Herreros
  Nicolás María Garelly Battifora
  Francisco Gayoso de los Cobos y Téllez Girón, Marqués de Camarasa
  Ramón Gil de la Cuadra
  Pedro Agustín Girón, Duque de Ahumada y Marqués de las Amarillas
  Tomás José González Carvajal
  Francisco González Castejón, Conde de Castejón
  Pedro González Vallejo, Arzobispo de Toledo y Obispo de Mallorca
  José Manuel de Goyeneche y Barreda, Conde de Guaqui
  Prudencio Guadalfajara y Aguilera, Duque de Castroterreño
  Mariano Guillamás Galiano, Marqués de San Felices
  Diego de Guzmán y de la Cerda, Conde de Oñate
  Narciso Heredia y Begines de los Ríos, Conde de Ofalia y Marqués de Heredia
  Justo María Ibar Navarro
  Mariano Liñán, Obispo de Teruel
  Manuel Llauder y Camín, Marqués del Valle de Rivas
  Ramón López Pelegrín
  Francisco Javier Losada Pardo, Conde de San Román
  Antonio Martínez
  Pedro Martínez de San Martín, Obispo de Barcelona
  Joaquín María Mencos y Eslava, Conde de Guendulain
  Francisco Milán de Aragón, Marqués de Albaida
  Antonio de Mora Oviedo Castillejo, Conde de Santa Ana
  Pablo Morillo, Conde de Cartagena
  Joaquín Navarro Sangrán, Conde de Casa-Sarriá
  Felipe María Osorio y de la Cueva, Conde de Cervellón
  Juan Nepomuceno Ozores de la Espada, Conde de Priegue
  Manuel de Pando Fernández de Pinedo, Marqués de Miraflores
  Jacobo María Parga y Puga
  Luís María Patiño Ramírez de Arellano, Marqués de Castelar
  Evaristo Pérez de Castro
  Fernando Pérez Del Pulgar y Ruiz de Molina, Marqués del Salar
  Nicolás Pérez Osorio y Zayas, Marqués de Alcañices
  Ignacio de la Pezuela y Sánchez
  Cipriano Portocarrero y Palafox, Conde de Teba  de Miranda y de Montijo
  Antonio Posada Rubín de Celis, Patriarca de las Indias
  José María Prado de Neyra, Marqués de San Martín de Hombreiro
  José María Puig de Samper
  Vicente Genaro Quesada Arango, Marqués de Moncayo
  Manuel José Quintana
  Lorenzo Ramo de San Blas Laoz, Obispo de Huesca
  Vicente Ramos García, Obispo electo de Almería
  José Antonio Rivadeneyra, Obispo de Valladolid
  Ignacio Rives y Mayor, Arzobispo de Burgos
  Juan Roca de Togores y Carrasco, Conde de Pinohermoso
  José Ramón Rodil, Marqués de Rodil
  Nicolás Roldán y Rioboo, Conde de Taboada
  Juan Ruiz de Apodaca y Eliza, Conde de Venadito
  José Francisco de Paula Ruíz de Molina y Cañaveral, Conde de Clavijo
  Ángel Saavedra Ramírez de Baquedano, Duque de Rivas
  Hipólito Sánchez Rangel, Obispo de Lugo
  José Gabriel Silva Bazán, Marqués de Santa Cruz
  Cayetano de Silva y Fernández de Córdoba, Conde de Salvatierra
  Isidro Alfonso Sousa de Portugal y Guzmán, Marqués de Guadalcázar
  Carlos Miguel Stuart Fitz James y Silva, Duque de Alba de Berwick y de Liria
  José Francisco Tavira, Marqués del Cerro de la Cabeza
  Pedro de Alcántara Téllez de Girón y Beaufort, Duque del Infantado y de Osuna
  Cayetano Valdés Flores
  Gerónimo Valdés Sierra, Conde de Villarín
  Francisco Javier Venegas de Saavedra y Rodríguez de Arenzana, Marqués de la Reunión de Nueva España
  Gaspar de Vigodet
  Francisco Javier Villanueva Barradas, Conde de Atares
  Francisco Dionisio Vives, Conde de Cuba
  Santiago Wall Manrique de Lara, Conde de Armíldez de Toledo
  Manuel José Zavala y Acedo, Conde de Villafuertes

References 

Politics of Spain